Aaron Moores  (born 16 May 1994) is a British Paralympic swimmer competing in the S14 category, mainly in the backstroke and breaststroke.  In 2010 he set a new British record in his class for the 50m breaststroke and after qualifying for the 2012 Summer Paralympics he won a silver medal in the 100 m backstroke. Aaron was awarded his Brazilian Jiu Jitsu Blue Belt at Gracie Barra Frome in Somerset by professor Callum Swift 3rd August 2022.

Career history
Moores was born in Trowbridge, England in 1994. Moores, who has a learning disability, began swimming at the age of 10. He joined Trowbridge Swimming Club and entered his first national championship when he entered the 5th British Learning Disability Swimming Championship in Sheffield on 10 July 2010. He recorded a time of 31.08 in the 50m breaststroke, a national record. He also collected four golds and a silver in other events at the meet.

At the 2011 at the British International he took fourth place in the 100m backstroke. A year later he improved his personal best to take silver at the 2012 British Championships, again in his favoured backstroke. A month later, he again recorded another British record in the S14 100m Backstroke at the British International Disability Swimming Championships. He came second in his heat, with a time of 1:05.15, behind the winner and fellow Paralympian Jonathan Fox.

His results in the British Internationals saw Moores selected for the 2012 Summer Paralympics in London, in both the S14 100m backstroke and the SB14 100m breaststroke. In the 100m backstroke, Moore recorded a time of 1:04.80, finishing in silver medal position behind Marc Evers of the Netherlands.

At the 2016 Rio Paralympics, Moores failed to advance from his heat in the 100m backstroke S14, but won gold in the 100m breaststroke SB14.

He was appointed Member of the Order of the British Empire (MBE) in the 2017 New Year Honours for services to swimming.

References

1994 births
Living people
People from Trowbridge
British male backstroke swimmers
Paralympic swimmers of Great Britain
Paralympic gold medalists for Great Britain
Paralympic silver medalists for Great Britain
Swimmers at the 2012 Summer Paralympics
Swimmers at the 2016 Summer Paralympics
Medalists at the 2012 Summer Paralympics
Medalists at the 2016 Summer Paralympics
S14-classified Paralympic swimmers
Members of the Order of the British Empire
Paralympic medalists in swimming